Lambeth and Southwark is a constituency represented in the London Assembly.

It consists of the London Borough of Lambeth and London Borough of Southwark.

Since the first assembly elections in 2000 it has been represented by the Labour Party, firstly by Val Shawcross, then by Florence Eshalomi (subsequently MP for Vauxhall, which falls under this constituency), and by Marina Ahmad since 2021.

Assembly members

Mayoral election results 
Below are the results for the candidate which received the highest share of the popular vote in the constituency at each mayoral election.

Assembly election results

References

London Assembly constituencies
Politics of the London Borough of Lambeth
Politics of the London Borough of Southwark
2000 establishments in England
Constituencies established in 2000